Instruments used specially in cardiology  are as follows:

References 

Medical equipment
Cardiology